The  is a ranking of Japan's top 100 universities by publisher Toyo Keizai released annually in its business magazine of the same name.

There are several lists ranking Japanese universities, often called Hensachi, with most measuring them by their entrance difficulty, or by their alumni's successes. The Hensachi Rankings have been most commonly used as a reference for a university's rank.

Given this context, "Truly Strong Universities"  (TSU) is a unique ranking system which ranks Japanese universities using eleven multidimensional indicators related to financial strength, education and research quality, and graduate prospects. It does not include any indicator of entrance difficulty. The system attempts to evaluate the university's strengths and the performance of its alumni, rather than students' prior academic abilities, or the brand of the college.

History
Toyo Keizai first published the "TSU" rankings in 2000. Its initial aim was to analyze private universities as companies, and conduct a financial analysis of them, which had rarely been attempted before by other mass-media. It also tried to focus on a practical point of view such as business-academia collaboration, students' academic achievements, and career support.

In 2004, the ranking system was reorganized with more multidimensional factors to capture universities not only as business organizations but also as educational and research institutions. In 2005, the report began to analyze national universities; they have been included in the rankings since 2006.

Methodology
The "TSU" ranking is designed to assess a university's strength as an organization. It uses eleven indicators in three categories. The eleven indicators contribute equally to the rankings after the calculation of standardized scores. "TSU" picked 181 major Japanese universities for its evaluation.

Financial strength
The financial strength concept consists of "Applicants' increasing ratio (%)", "Recurring profit margin (%)", "External fund gaining ratio (%)" and "Capital adequacy ratio (%)".

Education and research quality
Education and research quality is measured using "Spendings for education and research per income (%)", "Number of GP gainings", "Grants-in-Aid for Scientific Research (million yen)" and "Student/faculty ratio (%)".

Graduate prospects
Graduate prospects are evaluated using "Employment rate (%)", "Number of alumni as executives in listed companies in Japan" and "Average graduate salary at 30 years old (million yen)".

Effects
As Toyo Keizai is one of 3 Japan's leading business magazines, this ranking system is well known in Japan. When it is released, several news resources frequently report the rankings, and many universities announce their ranking. In fact, sales of the magazine are higher than usual when the ranking is released. Toyo Keizai stated it has received many responses from readers.

Rankings such as Employment Rate and Average Graduate Salary, which is more practical for students than the overall rankings, is often cited.

Criticisms
Toyo Keizai admitted that the ranking system has three main problems. First, the ranking has a tendency to be affected by single-year factors such as the gain of capital by the sale of assets. Because of this, it is recommended that readers look at the ranking of each university over the course of several years. Second, the value of university's brand is not reflected in the rankings. For this reason, some prestigious universities are placed in what would be considered lower positions. Third, there are no individual categories, such as private or public schools. As such, the universities' individual characteristics and strengths are not adequately considered. Furthermore, the total amount spent per student does not include labor costs, thereby improperly evaluating the Liberal Arts Colleges which spend significant amounts on labor (e.g. International Christian University).

References

External links

Japan
Universities and colleges in Japan